Ferenc Fülöp (born 22 February 1955 in Budapest) is a Hungarian football administrator with MTK Hungária FC. He played as a midfielder.

Between 1977 – 1986 he was a footballer of the MTK Hungária FC, then was contracted by the Belgian Olympic Charleroi where he spent 3 years. Fülöp was an unused member of the Hungary 1978 World Cup squad in Argentina.

Ferenc Fülöp played a role in the 1981 film Escape to Victory as a centre forward for the Nazi team in a match against a PoW team.

Escape to Victory (1981) – German Team Player (uncredited)

In 1993, he returned to Hungary, and he acted as the technical manager of the Hungarian national football team. From 1995 to 2006 he was the technical director of his former club, the MTK. In 2000, he was chosen by the Hungarian sportreporters the manager  of the year. Beginning from March 2006 he is working at the  Stars & Friends agency, intermediating international contracts for the Hungarian football players.

His late son, Márton Fülöp was also a footballer.

References

 
 

1955 births
Living people
Footballers from Budapest
Hungarian footballers
MTK Budapest FC players
R. Olympic Charleroi Châtelet Farciennes players
1978 FIFA World Cup players
Association football midfielders